{{DISPLAYTITLE:Lp sum}}
In mathematics, and specifically in functional analysis, the Lp sum of a family of Banach spaces is a way of turning a subset of the product set of the members of the family into a Banach space in its own right. The construction is motivated by the classical Lp spaces.

Definition

Let  be a family of Banach spaces, where  may have arbitrarily large cardinality. Set

the product vector space.

The index set  becomes a measure space when endowed with its counting measure (which we shall denote by ), and each element  induces a function

Thus, we may define a function

and we then set

together with the norm

The result is a normed Banach space, and this is precisely the Lp sum of

Properties

 Whenever infinitely many of the  contain a nonzero element, the topology induced by the above norm is strictly in between product and box topology.
 Whenever infinitely many of the  contain a nonzero element, the Lp sum is neither a product nor a coproduct.

References

Banach spaces
Lp spaces